Loke is a dispersed settlement in the Municipality of Nova Gorica in western Slovenia. It is located on the lowest edge of the Vipava Valley, just beneath the high Trnovo Forest Plateau. It is a satellite settlement of Kromberk, one of the four suburbs of Nova Gorica.

The local church is dedicated to Mary Magdalene and belongs to the Parish of Kromberk.

References

External links
Loke on Geopedia

Populated places in the City Municipality of Nova Gorica